In mathematics the Jacobian ideal or gradient ideal is the ideal generated by the Jacobian of a function or function germ.
Let  denote the ring of smooth functions in  variables and  a function in the ring.

Relation to deformation theory 
In deformation theory, the deformations of a hypersurface given by a polynomial  is classified by the ringThis is shown using the Kodaira–Spencer map.

Relation to Hodge theory 
In Hodge theory, there are objects called real Hodge structures which are the data of a real vector space  and an increasing filtration  of  satisfying a list of compatibility structures. For a smooth projective variety  there is a canonical Hodge structure.

Statement for degree d hypersurfaces 
In the special case  is defined by a homogeneous degree  polynomial  this Hodge structure can be understood completely from the Jacobian ideal. For its graded-pieces, this is given by the mapwhich is surjective on the primitive cohomology, denoted  and has the kernel .

Sketch of proof

Reduction to residue map 
For  there is an associated short exact sequence of complexeswhere the middle complex is the complex of sheaves of logarithmic forms and the right-hand map is the residue map. This has an associated long exact sequence in cohomology. Also, there is an isomorphism Through these isomorphisms there is an induced residue mapwhich is injective, and surjective on primitive cohomology. Also, there is the Hodge decompositionand .

Computation of de Rham cohomology group 
In turns out the cohomology group  is much more tractable and has an explicit description in terms of polynomials. This comes from the reduction isomorphismUsing the canonical -formon  where the  denotes the deletion from the index, these meromorphic differential forms look likewhereFinally, it turns out the kernel Lemma 8.11 is of all polynomials of the form  where . Note the Euler identityshows .

References

See also
Milnor number
Hodge structure
Kodaira–Spencer map
Gauss–Manin connection
Unfolding

Singularity theory
Ideals (ring theory)